The 2020–21 Tahiti Cup (also known as Coupe de Polynésie or Coupe Tahiti Nui) is the 82nd edition of the national cup in Tahitian football. A.S. Vénus are the title holders, having won the 2018–19 Tahiti Cup, since the 2019–20 edition was cancelled due the COVID-19 pandemic. In the final, A.S. Vénus defended the title, after defeating A.S. Pirae.

Teams
A total of 23 teams compete in the tournaments: ten teams from Tahiti Ligue 1, seven teams from Tahiti Ligue 2, six teams from Mo'orea, one team from Marquesas Islands and one team from Raiatea.

Teams from 2020–21 Tahiti Ligue 1
Arue
Central Sport
Dragon
Excelsior
Jeunes Tahitiens
Manu-Ura
Mataiea
Olympique de Mahina
Pirae
Taravao AC
Tefana
Tiare Tahiti
Vénus

Teams from 2020–21 Tahiti Ligue 2
Papara
Papenoo
Taiarapu
Tamarii Punaruu

Teams from Mo'orea
Mira
Tamarii Tapuhute
Temanava
Tiare Anani
Tiare Hinano
Tohie'a

The draw was held on 29 October 2019.

First round

Second round

Quarter-finals

Semifinals

Final

Top scorers

See also 

 :Category:Football competitions in French Polynesia
 :Category:Football clubs in French Polynesia
 :Category:Tahitian footballers

References

Tahiti Cup
2020–21 Oceanian domestic association football cups
2020–21 in French Polynesian football